Spit the Blues Out is the eleventh studio album released by The Saints.

Track listing 
All tracks composed by Chris Bailey; except where indicated
"A Gentleman Came Walking" - 4:09
"Who's Been Talking?" (Chester Burnett) - 2:59
"Waiting for God (Oh!)" - 3:44
"The Beginning of a Beautiful Friendship Louis" - 4:42
"Where Did My Mind Go?" - 2:53
"I Want to Be with You Tonight" (James Moore) - 5:06
"Drunken Angel" - 5:33
"Spit the Blues Out" - 6:37
"Mojo Erectus Howls" - 3:43
Unknown - 1:17
"Before You Accuse Me" (Ellas McDaniel) - 3:07
Unknown - 0:31
"You Got a Tale Babe" - 2:26
"It Hurts Me Too" (Elmore James) - 3:49

Personnel 
Chris Bailey - composer, vocals, guitar
Michael Bayliss - bass, backing vocals
Peter Wilkinson - drums, organ, backing vocals
Patrick Mathé - harmonica, guitar
Brendan Bailey - backing vocals
Elisabet Corlin - backing vocals
Caspar Wijnberg - Production/engineering and additional keyboards

References

Spit the Blues Out
Spit the Blues Out